Warden High School, located within the Warden School District in Warden, Washington, is a comprehensive high school.  The school is accredited by the Association of Educational Service Districts.  The current enrollment is about 290 students of which 30 are taking college level English. The school has 14 full time general education teachers, two special education teachers, and three teachers that are shared with the middle school. The principal is Courtney McCoy and their mascot is the Cougar.

Mission statement

Educating students for today and tomorrow.

Sports offered
Warden High School competes in the Central Washington League under WIAA 1A Classification in the following sports: 
Football
Volleyball
Soccer (Boys & Girls)
Wrestling (Boys & Girls)
Basketball (Boys & Girls)
Baseball
Softball
Golf (Boys & Girls)

State championships
Well known for wrestling, Warden has 8 state championships under head coach and Hall of Fame member, Rick Bowers.

Champions in: 1983, 1986, 1998, 2002, 2003, 2004, 2005, 2011, 2012

Runners-up in: 1999, 2000, 2001, 2009, 2010

References
 Warden School District's staff page

External links
 Warden High School
 Warden School District

High schools in Grant County, Washington
Public high schools in Washington (state)